Traian is a commune in Teleorman County, Muntenia, Romania. It is composed of a single village, Traian.

References

Communes in Teleorman County
Localities in Muntenia